Cheilotomona is an extinct genus of prehistoric marine gastropods in the family Goniasmatidae. The species C. elegans is from a Pelsonian/Illyrian marine shale/marl in the Triassic Qingyan Formation of Guizhou Province, China.

See also 
 List of marine gastropod genera in the fossil record

References

External links 

 
 

Prehistoric gastropod genera
Caenogastropoda
Triassic gastropods